Diego Javier Ferrín Valencia (born 21 March 1988 in Quinindé, Esmeraldas) is an Ecuadorian athlete competing in the high jump.

He competed at the 2012 Summer Olympics.

Personal bests
Outdoor
110 m hurdles: 14.26 s A (wind: +0.8 m/s) –  Quito, 28 May 2011
High jump: 2.30 m A –  Guadalajara, 27 October 2011
Long jump: 7.44 m (wind: +0.1 m/s) –  São Paulo, 6 July 2007
Indoor
High jump: 2.25 m –  Eaubonne, 11 February 2011

Competition record

References

External links
 
 

1988 births
Living people
People from Quinindé Canton
Ecuadorian male high jumpers
Athletes (track and field) at the 2012 Summer Olympics
Olympic athletes of Ecuador
World Athletics Championships athletes for Ecuador
Athletes (track and field) at the 2011 Pan American Games
Pan American Games medalists in athletics (track and field)
Pan American Games silver medalists for Ecuador
South American Games gold medalists for Ecuador
South American Games medalists in athletics
Competitors at the 2010 South American Games
Medalists at the 2011 Pan American Games
21st-century Ecuadorian people